Pakhaḷa ( Pakhāḷa) is an Odia cuisine, consisting of cooked rice washed or lightly fermented in water. The liquid part of the dish is known as Toraṇi ( ṭorāṇi). It is popular in the state of Odisha and its similar variants in the eastern regions like Jharkhand, Chhattisgarh, Bengal, and the northeastern states of Assam and Tripura.

It is a preparation that is consumed during summer, although many people eat it throughout the year, especially for lunch. It is popular among the public as it provides a refreshing food source during the hot climate and replenishes the nutrients in the body. A traditional Odia dish, it is prepared with rice, curd, cucumber, cumin seeds, fried onions and mint leaves. It is popularly served with dry roasted vegetables—such as potato, brinjal, badi and saga bhaja or fried fish.

Etymology
The term "pakhala" is derived from Pali word "pakhāḷitā" as well as Sanskrit word "Prakshāḷaṇa" (Sanskrit: प्रक्षाळन) which means "washed/to wash."

History
It is unknown when pakhaḷa was first included in the daily diet of Eastern India, but it was included in the recipe of Lord Jagannath Temple of Puri circa 10th cen. It seems that Pakhala is first introduced in Odisha. A special day, March 20, is celebrated in Odisha as Pakhala Dibasa every year. All Odia people celebrate this day. The Pakhaḷa is eaten in the eastern part of the Indian subcontinent (including Nepal and some parts of Myanmar). The word pakhaḷa was used in the Odia poems of Arjuna Das in his literary work Kaḷpalata (1520-1530 AD).

Classification
The different types of Pakhala classified as per preparation:

Popular variants
Saja Pakhaḷa (fresh pakhaḷa) is prepared by adding water instantly after making freshly cooked rice with drops of lemon in it. This variant doesn't need fermentation.
Basi Pakhaḷa (stale pakhala, basi in Odia means "stale") is prepared by fermenting rice by adding water which is generally kept overnight and eaten in the next day. This variant of pakhala follows the traditional method of preparation. People also eat it with badi chura along with diced onions and lemon to add flavors to the dish.
Jira Pakhaḷa is prepared by adding fried cumin with curry leaves to the pakhaḷa.
Dahi Pakhaḷa is prepared by adding curd to the pakhaḷa. Badi chura is taken as a side dish with pakhala.

Others
Garama pakhala (hot pakhala) is similar to saja pakhala (fresh pakhala) but is served with hot rice.
Paani Pakhala is a common variant prepared by only adding salt and water to the cooked rice.
Ada Pakhala is prepared by adding ginger and salt to the cooked rice soaked in water. 
Sugandhi Pakhala or Subasa Pakhala (flavored pakhala) is prepared by adding chopped or grated ginger and roasted cumin seeds to cooked rice submerged in salty water which gives an aroma to the pakhala.
Chupuda Pakhala (squeezed pakhala) is prepared by squeezing out the cooked rice washed in water and served with curd, roasted cumin and salt.
Mitha Pakhala (sweet pakhala) is prepared by adding sugar or jaggery to cooked rice and water along with roasted cumin. It is an unusual variant and not popular compared to popular fresh or stale pakhala. Sometimes oranges are added as well.
Tabhaa Pakhala is prepared by adding lemon water to the cooked rice.
Ghia Pakhala is prepared by adding ghee to the cooked rice.
Malliphula Pakhala is prepared by malli flowers(jasmine) to the cooked rice for aroma.

Preparation
The dish is typically prepared with rice that is cooked and allowed to cool. Cook normal rice, then cool it. Pour water in a bowl and add rice to it. In a pan, heat a pinch of oil, add mustard seeds, curry leaves, dry red chili and fry well. Add this chhunka or tadka into the pakhala bowl with sour curd. One can add mint leaves and raw salt to enhance the taste. To add more zing, one may opt for fish fry or sukhua poda (dry fish fried), saga bhaja, badi chura (a regional food item made up of batter of urad or black gram by drying under sunshine as small nuts and then fried to serve) and much more. Cumin seeds are fried, ground into a fine powder and added to curd with coriander leaves and salt.It is sometimes served with a fish fry and spinach.

Traditional preparation
Pakhaḷa is slightly fermented rice. The rice is cooked, water is added with little bit of old pakhal (something similar to making curd using milk and old curd). Pakhaḷa tastes best when served after 8 to 12 hours after preparation; in this case, no old pakhal is required to be added to the rice as fermentation usually happens after 6 hours of keeping rice in water. The Pakhala by itself tastes a bit sour, but also paste of green chilli, green Mango and ginger is added to give the Pakhala a little bit hot and sweet flavour.

Generally burnt potato or aloo poda (boiled is also used) and other fried vegetables or fried fish is served with pakhaḷa. Various side dishes include dahi baigana, kakharu phula bhaja (fried pumpkin flowers), mashed potatoes (alu bharata), fried fish (macha bhaja), fried prawns (chingudi bhaja), sukhua (dried fish) and saga bhaja (fired leafy vegetables).

Pakhala Dibasa
To promote the cuisine in modern era, Pakhala Dibasa was declared on 20 March 2011 by popular initiative to be celebrated by Odias worldwide. Thus 20 March is celebrated every year as Pakhala Dibas (Pakhala Day) by Odias across the regions where people eat and promote the cuisine.

As most of the Odia outside of Odisha live in Europe and in the Northern American regions, the weather in March is not suitable for cold-Pakhal. Therefore, the  International-Pakhal-Dibasa is celebrated on July 13.

Other regional variants
Chhattisgarh: bore bhat
Jharkhand: paani bhat
Gujarat: Ghesh Bhat
Tamil Nadu: pazhedhu saadham
Andhra Pradesh: saddi annam
Bengal: panta bhat
Assam: poita bhat
Kerala: Pazham Kanji

See also

 List of Indian dishes
 Cuisine of Odisha

References

External links
Universal pakhala divas
Pakhaḷa bhata
Water Rice
Pakhala Bhata of Odisha

Indian rice dishes
Odia cuisine